The 2021 Copa LP Chile was a professional women's tennis tournament played on outdoor clay courts. It was the fourth edition of the tournament which was part of the 2021 ITF Women's World Tennis Tour. It took place in Santiago, Chile between 8 and 14 November 2021.

Singles main-draw entrants

Seeds

 1 Rankings are as of 1 November 2021.

Other entrants
The following players received wildcards into the singles main draw:
  Fernanda Astete
  Fernanda Labraña
  Daniela López
  Solana Sierra

The following player received entry using a protected ranking:
  Olivia Tjandramulia

The following players received entry from the qualifying draw:
  Macarena Cannoni
  Isidora Cereso
  Jasmin Jebawy
  Alexandra Riley
  Jessy Rompies
  Jamilah Snells
  Javiera Verdugo
  Antonia Vergara Rivera

The following players received entry as lucky losers:
  Bianca Lia Anticán González
  María Ignacia Yapur López

Champions

Singles

  Anna Bondár def.  Verónica Cepede Royg, 6–2, 6–3

Doubles

  Arianne Hartono /  Olivia Tjandramulia def.  Katharina Gerlach /  Daniela Seguel, 6–1, 6–3

References

External links
 2021 Copa LP Chile at ITFtennis.com

2021 ITF Women's World Tennis Tour
2021 in Chilean tennis
November 2021 sports events in Chile